"The Day Is My Enemy" is a promotional single released by the British electronic band The Prodigy. It was released on 26 January 2015 and is the title track of their album of the same name.

It features drums played by the Top Secret Drum Corps, a Swiss drumming group and additional vocals from Martina Topley-Bird and Paul "Dirtcandy" Jackson. The song features lyrics from the song "All Through the Night", written by Cole Porter.

Track listing

Official versions and remixes
"The Day Is My Enemy" (feat. Dope D.O.D.) (Liam H Remix) (2:53)
"The Day Is My Enemy" (Caspa Remix) (3:30)
"The Day Is My Enemy" (Chris Avantgarde Remix) (3:52)
"The Day Is My Enemy" (LH Edit) (3:36)
"The Day Is My Enemy" (feat. Dope D.O.D.) (Liam H Remix) (Instrumental) (2:53)

Charts

References

The Prodigy songs
2015 songs
2015 singles
Songs written by Liam Howlett
Songs written by Cole Porter
Cooking Vinyl singles